Eau Galle is the name of some places in the U.S. state of Wisconsin:
Eau Galle, Dunn County, Wisconsin, a town
Eau Galle (community), Dunn County, Wisconsin, an unincorporated community
Eau Galle, St. Croix County, Wisconsin, a town